Maksymilian Siła-Nowicki (9 October 1826 – 30 October 1890) was a Polish zoology professor and pioneer conservationist in Austrian Poland, and father of the poet Franciszek Nowicki. He was brother-in-law to Kraków University law professor and rector Franciszek Kasparek.

Career
Nowicki began his career as a teacher in the countryside of eastern Galicia, and by dint of ambition and self-education eventually became a professor of zoology at Kraków University (1863–90).  In 1873, he was inducted into the Kraków-based Academy of Learning.  Also in 1873, he co-founded the Tatras Society (Towarzystwo Tatrzańskie).  In 1879, he founded the National Fishing Society (Krajowe Towarzystwo Rybackie). His greatest academic achievements were in entomology, ichthyology and ornithology.

Nowicki sought to give a practical bent to his research.  He wrote: "In the interest of husbandry in this country, it is appropriate to develop a knowledge of animals that are harmful to husbandry... and of animals that are useful to [it]."  It was chiefly thanks to him that the Galician Sejm in 1868 passed a law protecting chamois, marmots and Alpine birds in the Tatra Mountains.

Nowicki was the initiator of, and driving force behind, the Physiographic Commission (Komisja Fizjograficzna) of the Academy of Learning, and was a member of many other learned societies.

See also
Timeline of Polish science and technology
List of Poles

Notes

References
 "Siła-Nowicki, Maksymilian," Encyklopedia Polski (Encyclopedia of Poland), Kraków, Wydawnictwo Ryszard Kluszczyński, 1996, pp. 615–16.
 "Nowicki-Siła, Maksymilian," Encyklopedia powszechna PWN (PWN Universal Encyclopedia), Warsaw, Państwowe Wydawnictwo Naukowe, 1975, vol. 3, p. 312.
 "Nowicki-Siła, Maksymilian," Encyklopedia popularna PWN (PWN Popular Encyclopedia), Warsaw, Państwowe Wydawnictwo Naukowe, 1962, p. 711.
Evenhuis, N. L., 1997 Litteratura taxonomica dipterorum (1758-1930). Volume 1 (A-K); Volume 2 (L-Z). - Leiden, Backhuys Publishers 1; 2 : VII+1-426; 427-87 Volume 2: 562–563, Portrait and Schriftenverzeichnis

External links
 Polish Ethological Society article, in Polish, giving extensive details of Maksymilian Nowicki's adventurous, inspiring life.

1826 births
1890 deaths
People from the Kingdom of Galicia and Lodomeria
19th-century Polish zoologists
Polish entomologists
Polish ornithologists
Polish ichthyologists
Conservationists